Roland Edward Robinson OAM (12 June 1912 – 8 February 1992) was an Australian poet, writer and collector of Australian Aboriginal myths.

Life and career
Robinson was born in Balbriggan, Co, Dublin, Ireland in 1912. At the age of 9, in 1921 he was brought to Australia. After only a brief education he worked in various jobs, mainly in the bush as a roustabout, boundary-rider, railway fettler, fencer, dam-builder, gardener and as a lifelong love - a ballet dancer.

Robinson's first published poetry appeared in Beyond the Grass-Tree Spears published in 1944. He served in the Australian Army. His love of the Australian landscape and everyday scenes were inspiration for his poetry. He was one of the most dedicated poets to the Jindyworobak Movement.

As well as a writer and poet, Robinson was dance critic for The Sydney Morning Herald in the 1950s and 1960s. In the 1940s he took classes with Helene Kirsova and appeared in a number of productions by the Kirsova Ballet.

Robinson was a distinguished poet and writer who spent his later years in Lake Macquarie. After his death in 1992, Lake Macquarie City Council established The Roland Robinson Literary Award, an annual award to honour Robinson's contribution to literature and culture, and to foster creative literary talent in the city.

In 1997, Lake Macquarie City Council named the new library at Belmont in his honour.
Robinson worked very closely with Aboriginal people from all over Australia writing down their myths. Perhaps his most important work was conducted with various Aboriginal people from the New South Wales. In particular his collaboration with Percy Mumbulla of the Yuin people.

Awards
 1984 – recipient of the Medal of the Order of Australia, for "services to literature, particularly in the preservation of Australian Aboriginal mythology"
 1988 – Patrick White Award
 1991 – Honorary Degree, Doctor of Letters, University of Newcastle
 1991 – Freeman of the City of Lake Macquarie

Bibliography

Poetry
See also List of Poems by Roland Robinson
 Beyond the Grass-tree Spears: Verse (1944)
 Language of the Sand : Poems (1949)
 Tumult of the Swans (1953)
 Deep Well (1962)
 Altjeringa and Other Aboriginal Poems (1970)
 The Hooded Lamp (1976)
 Selected poems (1944-1982) (1983)

Writing
 Black-feller, white-feller (1958)
 The Man Who Sold his Dreaming (1965)
 Wandjina, Children of the Dreamtime : Aboriginal Myths & Legends  (1968) illustrations by Roderick Shaw
 Aboriginal myths & legends : age-old stories of the Australian tribes (1969)illustrated by Roderick Shaw
 The Australian Aboriginal (1977) photographs by Douglass Baglin

Autobiography
 The Drift of Things: an Autobiography, 1914-52 (1973)
 The Shift of Sands: an Autobiography, 1952-62 (1976)
 A Letter to Joan: an Autobiography, 1962-73 (1978)

Documentary
 The Back of Beyond (1954) directed by John Heyer
 "Roland Robinson: The land as voice" (Artwrite Pictures: 1987)

Notes

References

 
 
 

1912 births
1992 deaths
Australian memoirists
Recipients of the Medal of the Order of Australia
Patrick White Award winners
20th-century Australian poets
Australian male poets
Dance critics
20th-century Australian male writers
20th-century memoirists
Male non-fiction writers
Australian Army personnel of World War II
Irish emigrants to Australia (before 1923)